Student media most often refers to a student publication. It may also refer to:

 FIU Student Media, University Park, Florida, U.S.
 I-Comm Student Media, Brigham Young University–Idaho, Rexburg, Idaho, U.S.
 Marquette University Student Media, Milwaukee, Wisconsin, U.S.
 Student Media Interactive, the university's student-run World Wide Web development agency
 Rabelais Student Media, a student newspaper at La Trobe University, Melbourne, Australia
 Student Media (Kent State), Kent, Ohio, U.S.
 Student Media Awards, an annual All-Ireland student journalism competition
 Texas Student Media, an auxiliary enterprise of the University of Texas, Austin, Texas, U.S.

Student mass media